Oak Park High School is a high school in the North Kansas City School District in Kansas City, Missouri, United States. The student body is composed of ninth through twelfth grade students, with a 2017 enrollment of 1,549. The school's mascot is "Norman the Northman", a lumberjack character. The school is adjacent to Oak Grove Park in Gladstone, Missouri. The school's current principal is Mrs. Molly Smith.

Its boundary includes the majority of Gladstone (sections north of NW Englewood Road). The boundary also includes Oaks,  Oakview, Oakwood, and Oakwood Park.

History 
When Oak Park High School opened in 1965, it was the only North Kansas City high school  with air conditioning. It also featured a theater in the round, bookstore and four outdoor courtyards.

Dr. Dan Kahler was the school's original principal. The first Oak Park students graduated in 1966. Formerly, students attended North Kansas City High School located in North Kansas City, Missouri. Before being transferred to Oak Park, these students chose the school's colors, mascot, and wrote its alma mater.

Past Oak Park High School principals:
Dr. Dan Kahler (1965-1986)
Robert West (1986-1994)
Benny Cain (1994-2000)
John Krueger (2000-2006)
Fred Skretta (2006-2011)
Joe Hesmann (2011-2013)
Mark Maus (2013-2016)
Dr. Christopher Sartain (2016–2021)
Chris McCan (2021-2022)
Molly Smith (2022-present)

In 2015 the student body elected a transgender girl as its Homecoming queen. In response to this, the Westboro Baptist Church protested the school.

Awards 
Oak Park was named a 2018 National Model High School by the International Center for Leadership in Education.   They are one of only eight high schools in the nation to receive this distinction.  Specifically, they were chosen for their high expectations for all students. Oak Park received a score of 99.6% in 2015-2016 from the Missouri Department of Elementary and Secondary Education on their annual performance review.

Mascot 
Oak Park students chose Northmen as their mascot as the northern most high school in Kansas City at the time of the school's opening. The school's mascot was named "Norman the Northman", a lumberjack, embracing a tree theme fitting Oak Park and neighboring Oak Grove Park. The original newspaper was called "The Northman's Log" and the yearbook named the "Cambia", a reference to vascular cambium which makeup the rings of a tree that can be counted to tell its age.

Athletics 
Oak Park has seven state championships in wrestling, six in baseball, and three in cheerleading.

The varsity football team plays its home games at the North Kansas City District Activities Complex on the Staley High School campus. Prior to that, they played at North Kansas City High School's football stadium. But in the fall of 2021, the varsity team will have its own stadium due to the passing of a $155 million bond in June 2020. The concession stand will also serve nearby Oak Grove Park in Gladstone, Missouri.

Competitive teams include:

Men's and women's teams
Soccer (men in fall/women in spring)
Swimming and diving (men in fall/women in winter)
Tennis (men in fall/women in spring)
Golf (women in fall/men in spring)
Track and field (spring)
Cross country (fall)
Basketball (winter)
Wrestling (winter)
Cheerleading (year round) 

Men's only
Baseball (spring)
Football (fall)

Women's only
Softball (fall)
Pom/dance squad (year-round)
Volleyball (fall)

Notable alumni
 
 
 Ochai Agbaji - Basketball player for the Cleveland Cavaliers. Former player at the University of Kansas, NCAA champion, First Team All-American, 2022 Final Four Most Oustanding Player, 2022 Big 12 Player of the Year
 Kevin Ellis - retired Major League Soccer player
 Jessica Harp - country music singer
 Jason Johnson - retired National Football League player
 Rick Parker - retired Major League Baseball player 
 Ramona Riley-Bozier - college volleyball coach
 Ryan Silvey - Missouri legislator
 Chris Stigall - Radio DJ

References

External links 
 Oak Park High School official web site
 Oak Park High School Image Archive

Educational institutions established in 1965
1965 establishments in Missouri
High schools in Kansas City, Missouri
High schools in Clay County, Missouri
Public high schools in Missouri